, pen name of , was a Japanese writer, playwright, musician, photographer, and inventor. He is best known for his 1962 novel The Woman in the Dunes that was made into an award-winning film by Hiroshi Teshigahara in 1964. Abe has often been compared to Franz Kafka for his modernist sensibilities and his surreal, often nightmarish explorations of individuals in contemporary society.

Biography
Abe was born on March 7, 1924 in Kita, Tokyo, Japan and grew up in Mukden (now Shenyang) in Manchuria. Abe's family was in Tokyo at the time due to his father's year of medical research in Tokyo. His mother had been raised in Hokkaido, while he experienced childhood in Manchuria. This triplicate assignment of origin was influential to Abe, who told Nancy Shields in a 1978 interview, "I am essentially a man without a hometown. This may be what lies behind the 'hometown phobia' that runs in the depth of my feelings. All things that are valued for their stability offend me." As a child, Abe was interested in insect-collecting, mathematics, and reading. His favorite authors were Fyodor Dostoyevsky, Martin Heidegger, Karl Jaspers, Franz Kafka, Friedrich Nietzsche, and Edgar Allan Poe.

Abe returned to Tokyo briefly in April 1940 to study at Seijo High School, but a lung condition forced his return to Mukden, where he read Jaspers, Heidegger, Dostoyevsky, and Edmund Husserl. Abe began to study medicine at Tokyo Imperial University in 1943, partially out of respect for his father, but also because "[t]hose students who specialized in medicine were exempted from becoming soldiers. My friends who chose the humanities were killed in the war." He returned to Manchuria around the end of World War II. Specifically, Abe left the Tokyo University Medical School in October 1944, returning to his father's clinic in Mukden. That winter, his father died of eruptive typhus. Returning to Tokyo with his father's ashes, Abe reentered the medical school. Abe started writing novellas and short stories during his last year in university. He graduated in 1948 with a medical degree, joking once that he was allowed to graduate only on the condition that he would not practice.

In 1945 Abe married Machi Yamada, an artist and stage director, and the couple saw successes within their fields in similar time frames. Initially, they lived in an old barracks within a bombed-out area of the city center. Abe sold pickles and charcoal on the street to pay their bills. The couple joined a number of artistic study groups, such as Yoru no Kai (Group of the Night or The Night Society) and Nihon Bungaku Gakko (Japanese Literary School). Their daughter, Abe Neri, was born in 1954.

As the postwar period progressed, Abe's stance as an intellectual pacifist led to his joining the Japanese Communist Party, with which he worked to organize laborers in poor parts of Tokyo. Soon after receiving the Akutagawa Prize in 1951, Abe began to feel the constraints of the Communist Party's rules and regulations alongside doubts about what meaningful artistic works could be created in the genre of "socialist realism." By 1956, Abe began writing in solidarity with the Polish workers who were protesting against their Communist government, drawing the Communist Party's ire. The criticism reaffirmed his stance: "The Communist Party put pressure on me to change the content of the article and apologize. But I refused. I said I would never change my opinion on the matter. This was my first break with the Party." The next year, Abe traveled to Eastern Europe for the 20th Convention of the Soviet Communist Party. He saw little of interest there, but the arts gave him some solace. He visited Kafka's house in Prague, read Rilke and Karel Čapek, reflected on his idol Lu Xun, and was moved by a Mayakovsky play in Brno.

The Soviet invasion of Hungary in 1956 disgusted Abe. He attempted to leave the Communist Party, but resignations from the party were not accepted at the time. In 1960, he participated in the Anpo Protests against revision of the US-Japan Security Treaty as part of the pan-ideological Young Japan Society. He later wrote a play about the protests, The Day the Stones Speak, which was staged several times in Japan and China in 1960 and 1961. In the summer of 1961, Abe joined a group of other authors in criticizing the cultural policies of the Communist Party. He was forcibly expelled from the party the following year. His political activity came to an end in 1967 in the form of a statement published by himself, Yukio Mishima, Yasunari Kawabata, and Jun Ishikawa, protesting the treatment of writers, artists, and intellectuals in Communist China. According to translator John Nathan, this statement led to the falling-out between Abe and fellow writer Kenzaburō Ōe.

His experiences in Manchuria were also deeply influential on his writing, imprinting terrors and fever dreams that became surrealist hallmarks of his works. In his recollections of Mukden, these markers are evident: "The fact is, it may not have been trash in the center of the marsh at all; it may have been crows. I do have a memory of thousands of crows flying up from the swamp at dusk, as if the surface of the swamp were being lifted up into the air." The trash of the marsh was a truth of life, as were the crows, yet Abe's recollections of them tie them distinctively. Further experiences with the swamp centered around its use as a staking ground for condemned criminals with "[their] heads—now food for crows—appearing suddenly out of the darkness and disappearing again, terrified and attracted to us." These ideas are present in much of Abe's work.

Career
Abe was first published as a poet in 1947 with Mumei-shishū ("Poems of an unknown poet"), which he paid for himself, and as a novelist the following year with Owarishi michi no shirube ni ("The Road Sign at the End of the Street"), which established his reputation. When he received the Akutagawa Prize in 1951, his ability to continue publishing was confirmed. Though he did much work as an avant-garde novelist and playwright, it was not until the publication of The Woman in the Dunes in 1962 that Abe won widespread international acclaim.

In the 1960s, he collaborated with Japanese director Hiroshi Teshigahara on the film adaptations of The Pitfall, Woman in the Dunes, The Face of Another, and The Man Without a Map. Woman in the Dunes received widespread critical acclaim and was released only four months after Abe was expelled from the Japanese Communist Party.

In 1971, he founded the Abe Studio, an acting studio in Tokyo. Until the end of the decade, he trained performers and directed plays. The decision to found the studio came two years after he first directed his own work in 1969, a production of The Man Who Turned Into A Stick. The production's sets were designed by Abe's wife, and Hisashi Igawa starred. Abe had become dissatisfied with ability of the theatre to materialize the abstract, reducing it to a passive medium. Until 1979, he wrote, directed, and produced 14 plays at the Abe Studio. He also published two novels, Box Man (1973) and Secret Rendezvous (1977), alongside a series of essays, musical scores, and photographic exhibits. The Seibu Theater, an avant-garde theater in the new department store Parco, was allegedly established in 1973 specifically for Abe, though many other artists were given the chance to use it. The Abe Studio production of The Glasses of Love Are Rose Colored (1973) opened there. Later, the entirety of the Seibu Museum was used to present one of Abe's photographic works, An Exhibition of Images: I.

The Abe Studio provided a foil for much of the contemporary scene in Japanese theater, contrasting with the Haiyuza's conventional productions, opting to focus on dramatic, as opposed to physical, expression. It was a safe space for young performers, whom Abe would often recruit from the Toho Gakuen College in Chofu City, on the outskirts of Tokyo, where he taught. The average age of the performers in the studio was about 27 throughout the decade, as members left and fresh faces were brought in. Abe "deftly" handled issues arising from difference in stage experience.

In 1977 Abe was elected a Foreign Honorary Member of the American Academy of Arts and Sciences.

Awards
Among the honors Abe received were the Akutagawa Prize in 1951 for The Crime of S. Karuma, the Yomiuri Prize in 1962 for The Woman in the Dunes, and the Tanizaki Prize in 1967 for the play Friends. Kenzaburō Ōe credited Abe and other modern Japanese authors for "[creating] the way to the Nobel Prize", which he himself won. Abe was mentioned multiple times as a possible recipient, but his early death precluded that possibility.

Bibliography

Novels

Collected short stories

Plays

Essays

Poetry

References

External links

 
Abe Kobo at ibiblio.org

Kōbō Abe's grave

Japanese fantasy writers
Japanese science fiction writers
Japanese male short story writers
Writers from Tokyo
1924 births
1993 deaths
University of Tokyo alumni
Magic realism writers
Akutagawa Prize winners
Yomiuri Prize winners
Fellows of the American Academy of Arts and Sciences
Postmodern writers
20th-century Japanese novelists
20th-century Japanese dramatists and playwrights
20th-century Japanese short story writers
20th-century Japanese male writers
20th-century pseudonymous writers